Frank Smith is an American football coach who is the offensive coordinator for the Miami Dolphins of the National Football League (NFL). He has previously been a coach for the Los Angeles Chargers, New Orleans Saints, and Chicago Bears.

Coaching career

New Orleans Saints
In 2010, Smith was hired by the New Orleans Saints as their assistant offensive line coach. During his time with the Saints, Smith supported the offensive staff in game preparation and assisted with the offensive line. From 2010 to 2014, the Saints offensive line allowed just 143 sacks, third fewest in the NFL. Four Saints offensive linemen were named to the Pro Bowl during Smith’s time with the unit: T Jermon Bushrod, G Jahri Evans, G Ben Grubbs and G Carl Nicks. Evans was named first-team All-Pro by the Associated Press three times (2010–12) and Nicks earned the honor once (2011).

Chicago Bears
In 2015, Smith was hired by the Chicago Bears as their tight ends coach.

Oakland / Las Vegas Raiders
On January 13, 2018, Smith was hired by the Oakland Raiders as their tight ends coach under head coach Jon Gruden.

Los Angeles Chargers
In 2021 he worked as the run game coordinator and offensive line coach for the Chargers.

Miami Dolphins
On February 14, 2022, Smith was hired by the Miami Dolphins to serve as the team's offensive coordinator under newly-hired head coach Mike McDaniel.

References

External links
 Miami Dolphins bio

Living people
American football offensive linemen
Butler Bulldogs football coaches
Chicago Bears coaches
Miami RedHawks football coaches
Miami RedHawks football players
New Orleans Saints coaches
Las Vegas Raiders coaches
Oakland Raiders coaches
Los Angeles Chargers coaches
Sportspeople from Milwaukee
1981 births
Players of American football from Milwaukee
Miami Dolphins coaches
National Football League offensive coordinators